He & She is an American sitcom that aired on the CBS television network as part of its 1967–1968 lineup, originally sponsored by General Foods and Lever Brothers.

He & She is widely considered by broadcast historians to have been ahead of its time. Its sophisticated approach to comedy was viewed as opening doors to the groundbreaking MTM family of sitcoms of the 1970s, beginning with The Mary Tyler Moore Show in 1970. The character of Oscar was openly the pattern for the Ted Baxter character, for which creator Leonard Stern granted permission.

Synopsis
He & She stars real-life married couple Richard Benjamin and Paula Prentiss as Dick and Paula Hollister, a successful cartoonist and his wife, a social worker. Hollister's cartoon "Jetman" had been so successful that it was now a network television series starring egomaniacal actor Oscar North (Jack Cassidy) as the titular Jetman. North constantly argues with Hollister over the interpretation and direction of the Jetman character. Folksinger-actor Hamilton Camp played the role of handyman Andrew Hummel at the apartment building where the starring characters lived, and Kenneth Mars played firefighter Harry Zarakartos, who would often drop in on the Hollisters' apartment via a plank connected to the firehouse across the alley.

Writers Chris Hayward and Allan Burns, who created the series The Munsters, were hired by executive producer Leonard Stern (co-writer and producer of Get Smart) as story editors for He & She, for which they won the 1968 Emmy Award for comedy writing. The show received four other Emmy nominations that year, including nominations for Prentiss, Benjamin, and Cassidy. Burns would go on to be a writer and co-creator (among others) of The Mary Tyler Moore Show, of which He & She is considered a major forerunner. The show also earned three of the four Writers Guild nominations for Best Writing in a Comedy.

Despite the strong lead-in provided by Green Acres (a top-25 primetime show that season), He & She was cancelled after one season, although selected episodes were later rerun as a summer replacement series by CBS in 1970 following the cancellation of The Tim Conway Show. Reruns later aired on the USA Network in 1985-86 and TV Land ran selected episodes of the series in 1998, but it has not been seen since then. Cast members, such as Richard Benjamin, felt that the Green Acres lead-in actually hurt the show because the two series were so different in their approaches, rural and urban, respectively. The series was also a pioneer in the portrayal of the working wife, which was not yet in vogue on television.

List of episodes

References

 Brooks, Tim, and Marsh, Earle, The Complete Directory to Prime Time Network and Cable TV Shows
 Smith, Tracey, "He & She", Television Chronicles magazine, July 1997.

External links

 

1967 American television series debuts
1968 American television series endings
1960s American sitcoms
CBS original programming
Television series about marriage
Television series by CBS Studios
Television series by Warner Bros. Television Studios
Television shows set in New York City
English-language television shows
Fictional cartoonists
Television shows about comics